Douglas M. Overton (born August 3, 1969) is an American retired professional basketball player and coach.

Playing career
Prior to his NBA career, Overton spent a season with the Illawarra Hawks of the Australian NBL. He credits his experience playing in Australia as the reason he was able to make the NBA during a podcast with aussiehoopla.com 

Overton was selected by the Detroit Pistons in the 2nd round (40th overall) of the 1991 NBA draft. A 6'3" (1.90 m) point guard from La Salle University, Overton played in 11 NBA seasons for 8 teams. He played for the Washington Bullets, Denver Nuggets, Philadelphia 76ers, Orlando Magic, New Jersey Nets, Boston Celtics, Charlotte Hornets and Los Angeles Clippers.

In his NBA career, Overton played in 499 games and scored a total of 2,253 points.

Coaching career
In May 2006, Overton was named assistant men's basketball coach at Saint Joseph's University. He became an assistant coach for the NBA's New Jersey Nets (now Brooklyn Nets) in 2008. He was also named Nets Player Development Coach prior to the 2010–11 season. In August 2013, he was named head coach of the D-League's Springfield Armor. Overton currently coaches Lincoln University men's basketball in Oxford, Pennsylvania.

References

External links
Doug Overton's stats @ Basketball-reference.com
Saint Joseph's Hawks bio

1969 births
Living people
African-American basketball players
African-American basketball coaches
American expatriate basketball people in Australia
American expatriate basketball people in Spain
American men's basketball players
Basketball coaches from Pennsylvania
Boston Celtics players
Brooklyn Nets assistant coaches
Charlotte Hornets players
College men's basketball head coaches in the United States
Denver Nuggets players
Detroit Pistons draft picks
FC Barcelona Bàsquet players
Liga ACB players
Lincoln Lions men's basketball coaches
Los Angeles Clippers players
New Jersey Nets assistant coaches
New Jersey Nets players
Orlando Magic players
Philadelphia 76ers players
Point guards
Rockford Lightning players
Sportspeople from Philadelphia
Springfield Armor coaches
Washington Bullets players
Basketball players from Philadelphia
21st-century African-American people
20th-century African-American sportspeople